Michael Laurence (24 November 1935 – 23 March 2015) was an Australian actor, producer, director and screenwriter best known for creating TV serial  Return to Eden.

Biography
He began his career as a child actor on Sydney radio, before winning a scholarship at 18 to the London Academy of Music and Dramatic Art, before appearing in theatre productions, including everything from Shakespearean roles to musicals.

He created, directed and starred in the Nine Network production The Godfathers, which won the Logie Award for Best Comedy in 1971.

He worked on the popular serial Number 96, and other successful miniseries including the children's series The Lost Islands, a 22-part story on Network Ten, Which Way Home, The Last Frontier and Shadow of the Cobra. His work, including more than 200-hour of commercial television, was sold to numerous countries.

Select credits
Homicide (1966) - episode "The Black Book" - actor
On the Hop (1967) - TV play
Color Me Dead (1969) - actor
Squeeze a Flower (1970) - actor
The Long Arm (1970) - episode "Only a Wave Away" - actor
The Phallic Forest (1970) (short)-actor
The Godfathers (1971–72) - TV series - writer (all episodes)
The Spoiler (1972) - episode "Bye Bye Baby" - actor
Crisis (1972) (TV movie) - writer
The People Next Door (1973) - creator, writer
The Love Epidemic (1975) - co-writer, actor
The Lost Islands (1976) - writer, creator, producer
Number 96 - various episodes as writer
The Young Doctors - writer
People Like Us (1980) - writer, producer
Return to Eden (1983) - mini series - writer, co-producer
The Last Frontier (1986) - mini series
Shadow of the Cobra (1989) - writer
Which Way Home (1991) - TV movie - writer

References

External links
 
Michael Laurence at HLA
Obituary at Sydney Morning Herald

1935 births
2015 deaths
Australian autobiographers
Australian male child actors
Australian soap opera writers
Australian television producers
Australian male television writers